The 1883 NYU Violets football team was an American football team that represented New York University in the 1883 college football season. The team played two games, the score for week one is unknown while the score for the game against Paterson was a 4–2 win.

Schedule

References

NYU
NYU Violets football seasons
NYU Violets football